Endgame, by Samuel Beckett, is an absurdist, tragicomic one-act play about a blind, paralyzed, domineering elderly man, his geriatric parents and his doddering, dithering, harried, servile companion in an abandoned shack in a post-apocalyptic wasteland who mention they are awaiting some unspecified "end" which seems to be the end of their relationship, death, and the end of the actual play itself. Much of the play's content consists of terse, back and forth dialogue between the characters reminiscent of bantering, along with trivial stage actions; the plot is held together by the development of a grotesque story-within-a-story the character Hamm is writing. An aesthetically profound part of the play is the way the story-within-story and the actual play come to an end at roughly the same time. The play's title refers to chess and frames the characters as acting out a losing battle with each other or their fate.

Originally written in French (entitled Fin de partie), the play was translated into English by Beckett himself  and was first performed on April 3, 1957 at the Royal Court Theatre in London in a French-language production. Written before but premiering after Waiting for Godot, it is arguably among Beckett's best works. The literary critic Harold Bloom called it the greatest prose drama of the 20th century, saying "I know of no other work of its reverberatory power," but stated that he could not handle reading it in old age for its harrowing, bare bone existentialism . Samuel Beckett considered it his masterpiece as the most aesthetically perfect, compact representation of his artistic views on human existence, and refers to it when speaking autobiographically through Krapp in Krapp's Last Tape when he mentions he had "already written the masterpiece". .

Characters
 Hamm: Throughout the play remaining seated in an armchair fitted with castors, unable to stand and blind. Hamm is dominating, acrimonious, banterous and comfortable in his misery. He claims to suffer, but his pessimism seems self-elected. He chooses to be isolated and self-absorbed. His relationships come off as parched of human empathy; he refers to his father as a "fornicator", refused to help his neighbor with oil for her lamp when she badly needed it, and has a fake pet dog which is a stuffed animal.
 Clov: Hamm's servant who is unable to sit. Taken in by Hamm as a child. Clov is wistful. He longs for something else, but has nothing to pursue. More mundane than Hamm, he reflects on his opportunities but takes little charge. Clov is benevolent, but weary.
 Nagg: Hamm's father who has no legs and lives in a dustbin. Nagg is gentle and fatherly, yet sorrowful and aggrieved in the face of his son's ingratitude.
 Nell: Hamm's mother who has no legs and lives in a dustbin next to Nagg. Reflective, she delivers a monologue about a beautiful day on Lake Como, and apparently dies during the course of the play.

Samuel Beckett said that in his choice of character's names, he had in mind the word "hammer" and the word "nail" in English, French and German respectively, "clou" and "nagel".

Beckett was an avid chess player, and the term endgame refers to the ending phase of a chess game. The play is dimly visible as a kind of metaphorical chess, albeit with limited symbolic meaning. Hamm at one point says "My kingdom for a knight-man!". Hamm, limited in his movement, resembles the king piece on a chess board, and Clov, who moves for him, a knight.

Synopsis

In a dreary, dim and nondescript room, Clov draws the curtains from the windows and prepares his master Hamm for his day. He says, "It's nearly finished," though it is not clear what he is referring to. He awakes Hamm by pulling a sheet from over him. After Hamm removes a bloodstained handkerchief from over his head and face, he says "It's time it ended." He summons Clov by means of a whistle, and they banter briefly.

Eventually, Hamm's parents, Nell and Nagg, appear from inside two trash cans at the back of the stage. Hamm is as equally threatening, condescending and acrimonious with his parents as with his servant, though they still share a degree of mutual humor; Nell eventually sinks back into her bin, and Clov, examining her, says, "She has no pulse." Hamm tells his father he is telling a story and recites it partially to him, a fragment which treats on a derelict man who comes crawling on his belly to the narrator, who is putting up Christmas decorations, begging him for food for his starving boy sheltering in the wilderness.

Clov returns, and they continue to banter in a way that is both quick-witted and comical yet with dark, overt existential undertones. Clov often threatens to leave Hamm, but it is made clear that he has nowhere to go as the world outside seems to be destroyed. Much of the stage action is intentionally banal and monotonous, including sequences where Clov moves Hamm's chair in various directions so that he feels to be in the right position, as well as moving him nearer to the window.

By the end of the play, Clov finally seems intent on pursuing his commitment of leaving his cruel master Hamm. Clov tells him there is no more of the painkiller left, which Hamm has been insisting on getting his dose of throughout the play. Hamm finishes his dark, chilling story by having the narrator berate the collapsed man for the futility of trying to feed his son for a few more days when evidently their luck has run out (it becomes plain that the character of the narrator is Hamm himself, relating the events which brought Clov [the man's son] to him). Hamm believes Clov has left, being blind, but Clov re-enters and stands in the room silently with his coat on and carrying luggage, going nowhere. Hamm calls for his father, but receives no answer; he discards some of his belongings, and says that, though he has made his exit, his bloodstained handkerchief, which he replaces over his face and head, will "remain".

Analysis

Endgame is an expression of existential angst and despair and depicts Beckett's philosophical worldview, namely the extreme futility of human life and the inescapable dissatisfaction and decay intrinsic to it. The existential feelings buried in the work achieve their most vocal moments in lines such as "It will be the end and there I'll be, wondering what can have brought it on and wondering... why it was so long coming," and "Infinite emptiness will be all around you, all the resurrected dead of all the ages wouldn't fill it, and there you'll be like a little bit of grit in the middle of the steppe," in both of which Hamm seems to contemplate the sense of dread awakened by the obliterating force of death.

Endgame is also a quintessential work of what Beckett called "tragicomedy", or the idea that, as Nell herself in the play puts it, "Nothing is funnier than unhappiness." Another way to think about this is that things which are absurd can be encountered both as funny in some contexts and horrifyingly incomprehensible in others. Beckett's work combines these two responses in his vast artistic vision of depicting not a segment of lived experience but the very philosophical nature of life itself, in the grandest view, as the central subject material of the play. To Beckett – due to his existential worldview – life itself is absurd, and this incurs reactions of both black mirth and profound despair. To Beckett, these emotions are deeply related, and this is evident in the many witty yet dark rejoinders in the play, such as Hamm's comment in his story, "You're on Earth, there's no cure for that!", which both implies in a melodramatic fashion that being born is a curse, but sounds perhaps like a biting, bar-talk joke, such as telling someone "You're Irish, there's no cure for that!"

Samuel Beckett makes heavy use of repetition, in which certain recurrent short phrases or sentence patterns are spread out throughout the play and in various characters' dialogue. Many of the ideas are conceptually, logically novel, almost reminiscent of Lewis Carroll, such as the play beginning with the ingeniously witty subversion of a rhetorical question "Can there be misery loftier than mine?" with the literal answer, "No doubt," the sense of cleverness of design in the way the first thing Hamm requests after Clov has woken him up is to be gotten ready to go back to bed, and in the odd yet entrancing way in which Hamm describes the scene of his story with recourse to a wide variety of instruments such as a heliometer. Beyond this high degree of conceptual playfulness, the play is suffused, in characteristic Beckett fashion, with everyday expressions which are subverted and take on either mind-bending, absurd meanings and/or an existential resonance, as if lurking beneath the surface of our most common daily doings and parlance lies the unmistakable absurdity, or illogicality, of life and the world. One small example of many would be when Hamm asks "What time is it?" and Clov replies "The same as usual."

Most key to the overall functioning of the play seems to be core aesthetic ideas, new explorations of form that were at work throughout Beckett's oeuvre and very central to the foregoing Godot – a play in which almost nothing happens, plot-wise, and furthermore, as many elements or levels of narrative craft seem to take a null value – there is seemingly no character development, and the location is vague and very poorly defined. Although Beckett had a reputation for keeping mum about the ideas behind his work, he specifically had published a conversation he had with a painter detailing precisely this aspect of his aesthetic vision which he wanted people to know – that his work was a realization of there being "nothing to express, no way to express it".

Overall, the value, or effect, or the play is a unique, hypnotic aesthetic experience which gives a kind of slow-burning existential catharsis. Being unconventional in form and material, it does not have a traditional Aristotelian catharsis, importantly because it does not seek redemption for its characters. Beckett, who understood and wrote about his understanding of tragedy as the pure depiction or expression of a sorry fate, created the ultimate negative art form. Thus, while many people suffer quietly from existential fear or horror, only in Beckett is this feeling provocatively confronted, rather than ameliorated or suppressed. To gaze so clearly into the depiction of something so tragic yet so true has the true effect of art, which is expression. The mere act of a singer lamenting a sad story is an aesthetic act in itself, a listener takes value in the sentimentality of the experience. The same is true for Beckett: merely to encounter the direct, pure expression of existential feeling is experienced as inherently rewarding. Beckett characterized his work by invoking the book of Ecclesiastes when defending the line "The bastard, he doesn't exist!", in reference to God, by saying, "It isn't any different from saying 'My God, why have you abandoned me?'" Therefore, for Beckett Endgame was an emotional, tragic yet affirming way of dealing with a perceived sense of spiritual abandonment in life and existence.

Much of Beckett's core thought which is expanded on in Endgame is in his critical analysis of Marcel Proust, entitled "Proust". In it, he explains his Schopenhauerian view of the human will endlessly chasing after momentary satisfaction that it can rarely if ever constantly attain, which lies behind the image of "grain upon grain" (moments in life and time) never amounting to "the impossible heap" (some fixed, non-transient accumulation or deposition of enduring value, in time).

A Stanford undergraduate journal published a transhumanist interpretation of Endgame.

Themes

Possible themes in Endgame include decay, insatiety and dissatisfaction, pain, monotony, absurdity, humor, horror, meaninglessness, nothingness, existentialism, nonsense, solipsism and people's inability to relate to or find completion in one another, narrative or story-telling, family relations, nature, destruction, abandonment, and sorrow.

Key features, symbols and motifs
Hamm's story is broken up and told in segments throughout the play. It serves essentially as part of the climax of Endgame, albeit somewhat inconclusively.

Hamm's story is gripping for how the narrative tone it is told in contrasts with the way the play the characters are in seems to be written or proceed. Whereas Endgame is somehow lurching, starting and stopping, rambling, unbearably impatient and sometimes incoherent, Hamm's story in some ways has a much more clear, liquid, fluid, descriptive narrative lens to it. In fact, in the way it uses run-of-the-mill literary techniques like describing the setting, facial expressions or an exchange of dialogue, in slightly bizarre ways, it almost seems like a parody of writing itself. Beckett's eerie, weird stories about people at their last gasp often doing or seeking something futile somehow seems to return again and again as central to his art. It could be taken to represent the inanity of existence, but it also seems to hint at mocking not only life but storytelling itself, inverting and negating the literary craft with stories that are idiotically written, anything from poorly to put-on and overwrought.

Extremely characteristic Beckettian features in the work, represented by many lines throughout the work, are bicycles, a seemingly imaginary son, pity, darkness, a shelter, and a story being told.

The play has postmodern features in that the characters recurrently hint that they are aware they are characters in a play.

Production history
The play was premiered on 3 April 1957 at the Royal Court Theatre, London, performed in French. The production was directed by Roger Blin, who also played Hamm, with Jean Martin as Clov, Georges Adet as Nagg and Christine Tsingos as Nell.

Other early productions included a 1958 production at the Cherry Lane Theatre in New York, directed by Alan Schneider with Lester Rawlins as Hamm, Alvin Epstein as Clov, Nydia Westman as Nell and P. J. Kelly as Nagg (a recording of the play, with Gerald Hiken replacing Epstein, was released by Evergreen Records in 1958); and at the Royal Court Theatre in London directed by George Devine who also played Hamm, with Jack MacGowran as Clov.

In the early 1960s, an English language production produced by Philippe Staib and directed by Beckett, with Patrick Magee and Jack MacGowran, was staged at the Studio des Champs-Elysees, Paris. After the Paris production, Beckett directed two other productions of the play: at the Schiller Theater Werkstatt, Berlin, 26 September 1967, with Ernst Schröder as Hamm and Horst Bollmann as Clov; and at the Riverside Studios, London, May 1980 with Rick Cluchey as Hamm and Bud Thorpe as Clov.

In 1984, JoAnne Akalaitis directed the play at the American Repertory Theatre in Cambridge, Massachusetts. The production featured music from Philip Glass and was set in a derelict subway tunnel. Grove Press, the owner of Beckett's work, took legal action against the theatre. The issue was settled out of court through the agreement of an insert into the program, part of which was written by Beckett:

Any production of Endgame which ignores my stage directions is completely unacceptable to me. My play requires an empty room and two small windows. The American Repertory Theater production which dismisses my directions is a complete parody of the play as conceived by me. Anybody who cares for the work couldn't fail to be disgusted by this.

In 1985 Beckett directed "Waiting for Godot", "Krapp's Last Tape" and "Endgame" as stage pieces with the San Quentin Players. All three productions were grouped together under the title "Beckett Directs Beckett", and the production toured Europe and parts of Asia.

In 1991, a TV movie production was filmed with Stephen Rea as Clov, Norman Beaton as Hamm, Charlie Drake as Nagg and Kate Binchy as Nell.

In 1992, a videotaped production directed by Beckett, with Walter Asmus as the television director, was made as part of the Beckett Directs Beckett series, with Rick Cluchey as Hamm, Bud Thorpe as Clov, Alan Mandell as Nagg and Teresita Garcia-Suro as Nell.

A production with Michael Gambon as Hamm and David Thewlis as Clov and directed by Conor McPherson was filmed in 2000 as part of the Beckett on Film project.

In 2004, a production with Michael Gambon as Hamm and Lee Evans as Clov was staged at London's Albery Theatre, directed by Matthew Warchus.

In 2005, Tony Roberts starred as Hamm in a production directed by Charlotte Moore at the Irish Repertory Theater in New York City with Alvin Epstein as Nagg, Adam Heller as Clov and Kathryn Grody as Nell.

In 2008 there was a brief revival staged at the Brooklyn Academy of Music starring John Turturro as Hamm, Max Casella as Clov, Alvin Epstein as Nagg and Elaine Stritch as Nell. New York theatre veteran Andrei Belgrader directed, replacing originally-sought Sam Mendes.

In 2009, the British theatre company Complicite staged the play in London's West End with Mark Rylance as Hamm and Simon McBurney (who also directed the production) as Clov. The production also featured Tom Hickey as Nagg and Miriam Margolyes as Nell. The production opened on 2 October 2009 at the Duchess Theatre. Tim Hatley designed the set.

In 2010, Steppenwolf Theatre Company staged Endgame. It was directed by Frank Galati and starred Ian Barford as Clov, William Petersen as Hamm, Francis Guinan as Nagg, and Martha Lavey as Nell. James Schuette was responsible for set and scenic design.

In 2015, two of Australia's major state theatre companies staged the play. For Sydney Theatre Company, Andrew Upton directed the production, featuring Hugo Weaving as Hamm, and for Melbourne Theatre Company, Colin Friels starred in a production directed by Sam Strong and designed by visual artist Callum Morton.

In 2016, Coronation Street actors David Neilson and Chris Gascoyne starred in a staging of the play at both the Citizens Theatre in Glasgow and HOME in Manchester.

In 2019, the play was produced by Pan Pan Theatre at the Project Arts Centre in Dublin. The production was directed by Gavin Quinn and starred Andrew Bennett, Des Keogh, Rosaleen Linehan and Antony Morris. The production was designed by Aedin Cosgrove.

In 2020, the Old Vic in London staged a production directed by Richard Jones with Alan Cumming as Hamm, Daniel Radcliffe as Clov, Jane Horrocks as Nell and Karl Johnson as Nagg in a double bill with Rough for Theatre II. Unfortunately, the production had to end its run two weeks earlier than its planned closing date of 28 March 2020 due to concerns over an outbreak of COVID-19.

Dublin's Gate Theatre staged the play in 2022. Directed by Danya Taymor, Hamm was played by Frankie Boyle and Clov by Robert Sheehan, with Seán McGinley and Gina Moxley as Nagg and Nell.

The French version was staged in 2022 at the Théâtre de l'Atelier in Paris. Jacques Osinski directed, Hamm was played by Frédéric Leidgens, Clov by Denis Lavant, Nagg and Nell by Peter Bonke and Claudine Delvaux.

A new production directed by Ciarán O'Reilly opened at the Irish Repertory Theater in New York City with previews beginning 25 January 2023 and an opening date of 02 February, with John Douglas Thompson as Hamm, Bill Irwin as Clov, Joe Grifasi as Nagg and Patrice Johnson Chevannes as Nell. The production was originally scheduled to run until 12 March, but has now been extended until 09 April.

Adaptations
The play was adapted into an opera by György Kurtág, premiered at the Teatro alla Scala in 2018.
The play also inspired Pixar's short film Geri's Game, portraying a static chess game.

References

Sources

  Rpt. in The Adorno Reader. Ed. Brian O'Connor. London: Blackwell, 2000. 319–352. .
 
 Cohn, Ruby. 1973. Back to Beckett. Princeton: Princeton UP. .
 

Byron, M. S. (2007). Samuel Beckett's Endgame. Amsterdam: Rodopi.

Beckett, S., In Gontarski, S. E., & In Knowlson, J. (2019). The theatrical notebooks of Samuel Beckett: Volume II, Endgame.

External links
 
 Study guide for Endgame
 Rick Cluchey as Hamm
 See Stephen Rea and Norman Beaton in Endgame (1991) on YouTube
 See the San Quentin Workshop production of Endgame (1992) on YouTube

1957 plays
French plays
Plays by Samuel Beckett
One-act plays
Plays adapted into operas
Tragicomedy plays